Anastasiia Kolisnichenko is a Ukraine-born sportsperson. She was part of the Olympic acrobatic academy.

References 

 
Female acrobatic gymnasts
1994 births
Living people